Satish Manwar is an Indian film director and screenwriter. He grew up in a rural Maharashtra and moved to Pune to learn drama at Center for Performing Arts, commonly known as Lalit Kala Kendra, at Pune University. After receiving his M.A. in 1998, he moved to Mumbai to work as an assistant editor and assistant director. He along with his fellow friends and alumni of Lalit Kala Kendra co-founded a theatre group called Lalit Mumbai.

His work often deals with the differences between rural and urban areas.

Selected filmography

Personal life 
Manwar is married to Marathi playwright and screenwriter, Manaswini Lata Ravindra.

References

External links
 

Living people
Hindi-language film directors
Indian male screenwriters
Year of birth missing (living people)
Place of birth missing (living people)